The Winged Victory of Samothrace is a sculpture of the Greek goddess Nike in the Louvre Museum.

Winged Victory may also refer to:
Winged victories, a pair of personifications of victory frequently depicted in art, especially in architectural sculpture 
Winged Victory (character), a character in the Astro City comic book series
Winged Victory (novel), a semi-autobiographical novel by Victor Maslin Yeates
Winged Victory (play), a 1943 play by Moss Hart
Winged Victory (film), a 1944 film by George Cukor based on the play
Winged Victory (Lewis), a group statue in Olympia, Washington, United States, including a copy of the Samothrace figure

See also
 Nike (mythology)
 Victoria (mythology)